The National Film Award for Best Female Playback Singer is an honour presented annually at the National Film Awards of India since 1968 to a female playback singer for the best renditions of songs from soundtracks within the Indian film industry. Throughout the years, accounting for ties and repeat winners, the Government of India has presented 46 Best Female Playback Singer awards to 24 female playback singers. The first recipient was P. Susheela, who was honoured at the 16th National Film Award (1968) for her renditions from the Tamil film Uyarntha Manithan. The singer who won the most Rajat Kamal awards is K S Chithra with six wins, followed by P. Susheela with five. As of 2013, two singers—S. Janaki and Shreya Ghoshal—have won the award four times, and two—Lata Mangeshkar and Vani Jairam—have won it thrice. The award has been won twice by Asha Bhosle, Alka Yagnik and Arati Ankalikar-Tikekar. S. Janaki, K. S. Chithra, and Shreya Ghoshal have won the award for their renditions in three languages. Shreya Ghoshal is the sole recipient of the award for two songs in the same year in two languages. Uthara Unnikrishnan is the youngest winner, picking up the award at the age of 10 for the rendition of a song from the Tamil film Saivam (2014). No award was given for this category in 1973.

Multiple winners

Recipients 
List of award recipients, showing the year (award ceremony), song(s), film(s), language(s) and citation.

See also
National Film Award for Best Male Playback Singer

References

External links 
 Official Page for Directorate of Film Festivals, India
 National Film Awards Archives

Female Playback Singer
Indian music awards
Film music awards
Music awards honoring women